is a railway station on the Tōhoku Main Line in the city of Date, Fukushima, Japan, operated by East Japan Railway Company (JR East).

Lines
Date Station is served by the Tōhoku Main Line, and is located 281.9 kilometers from the official starting point of the line at Tokyo Station.

Station layout
Date Station has two opposed side platforms connected to the station building by a footbridge. There is also a parking lot with both paid parking and an option to park free of cost for up to thirty minutes. The station is attended.

Platforms

History
It was renamed "Date Station" on December 1, 1914. The current station building was completed in 1939 and built to resemble a building adjacent to the Ryozen Shrine in Date City's former town of Ryozen. The station was absorbed into the JR East network upon the privatization of the Japanese National Railways (JNR) on April 1, 1987. In 2002, it was chosen to be one of 100 stations representing the Tōhoku region. In 2020 renovations were completed on the area in front of the station.

Passenger statistics
In fiscal 2016, the station was used by an average of 941 passengers daily (boarding passengers only).

Surrounding area
Date Post Office
Former Date town hall

See also
 List of Railway Stations in Japan

References

External links
 
  

Stations of East Japan Railway Company
Railway stations in Fukushima Prefecture
Tōhoku Main Line
Railway stations in Japan opened in 1895
Date, Fukushima